The MCC Boléa is a Swiss single-place paraglider that was designed by Paul Amiell and produced by MCC Aviation of Grandvaux. It is now out of production.

Design and development
The Boléa was designed as an intermediate glider. The models are each named for their relative size.

Operational history
Reviewer Noel Bertrand described the Boléa in a 2003 review as "a very likable high performance wing".

Variants
Boléa S
Small-sized model for lighter pilots. The glider model is DHV 1-2 certified.
Boléa M
Mid-sized model for medium-weight pilots. The glider model is DHV 1-2 certified.
Boléa L
Large-sized model for heavier pilots. The glider model is DHV 1-2 certified.

Specifications (Boléa M)

References

Bolea
Paragliders